The Peak is a Singaporean Chinese drama which is telecast on Singapore's free-to-air channel, MediaCorp Channel 8. It made its debut on 8 January 2007 and ended its run on 5 February 2007. The show was initially slated for a 20-episode run, but was extended to 21 episodes due to over-runs in the recording of the drama.

Despite several negative reviews, the show was watched by almost 1 million viewers, making it one of the highest rated local dramas, breaking records previously held by A Million Treasures and Measure of Man.

Cast

Main cast
Christopher Lee as Fang Hong'an
Qi Yuwu as Chen Tianjun
Elvin Ng as Cai Zhihang
Jeanette Aw as Zhong Xiaoyang
Dawn Yeoh as Cai Zhenya

Supporting Cast
Ben Yeo as Lu Ka
Ann Kok as Xiu Ping
Lin Meijiao as Ling Ling
Huang Wenyong as Tie Tou
Eelyn Kok as Lin Shuanghui

Basic Information
This 21 episode Mandarin drama of bittersweet romance, friendship and passionate pursuit is against the backdrop of the dynamic and global arena of the offshore and marine and maritime industry of Singapore.

Set primarily in Keppel FELS in Singapore, the span of this serial reaches to the picturesque Keppel FELS Brasil in Angra dos Reis, Rio de Janeiro, Brazil, and has a multinational cast from the two Americas, Middle East, Europe and Asia.

Viewership Rating

See also
List of programmes broadcast by Mediacorp Channel 8

External links
The Peak Theme Song
Official Website (English Edition)
Official Website (Chinese Edition)

Singapore Chinese dramas
2007 Singaporean television series debuts
2007 Singaporean television series endings
Channel 8 (Singapore) original programming